The 2009 Western Cape provincial election was held on 22 April 2009 alongside the 2009 general elections to elect the 42 members of the 4th Western Cape Provincial Parliament. It was the third time in provincial history that saw a change of government.

The African National Congress (ANC) held a majority at the end of the outgoing provincial parliament. As a result of the election, the official opposition Democratic Alliance (DA) were elected to a majority government under premier candidate Helen Zille. The DA formed the provincial government for the first time in its history, displacing the ANC, who came in second and consequently assumed the title of the official opposition in the province. The ANC had won a plurality of seats in the 2004 election and became the governing party. The Independent Democrats (ID) were replaced as the third-largest party by the ANC breakaway party, the Congress of the People (COPE).

The politics of the Western Cape are more complex than the rest of South Africa, as the province is more hotly-contested each election cycle compared to other provinces and voters had elected hung provincial parliaments since the 1994 elections. This election marked the first time since the end of apartheid that a party achieved a majority of seats in the provincial parliament. Analysts suggest that the ANC-COPE split made it easier for the DA to win the province.

In the run-up to the election, analysts suggested that the DA would perform strongly in the province, with some expecting the party to dislodge the ANC from government. On 25 April, the Independent Electoral Commission (IEC) project that the party would win the province with an overall majority.

DA leader and premier candidate, Helen Zille, was elected and sworn into office on 6 May 2009. Former premier Lynne Brown assumed the post of leader of the opposition.

Results

References

Western Cape
Western Cape provincial election
Elections in the Western Cape